Martín Sarmiento de Osacastro, O.F.M. (died 1557) was a Roman Catholic prelate who served as Bishop of Tlaxcala (1548–1557).

Biography
Martín Sarmiento de Osacastro was appointed a priest in the Order of Friars Minor. 
On 13 Jun 1548, he was appointed during the papacy of Pope Paul III as Bishop of Tlaxcala.
On 7 Apr 1549, he was consecrated bishop by Juan Lopez de Zárate, Bishop of Antequera. 
He served as Bishop of Tlaxcala until his death on 19 Oct 1557.

While bishop, he was the principal consecrator of Pedro Gómez Malaver, Bishop of Guadalajara (1550).

References

External links and additional sources
 (for Chronology of Bishops) 
 (for Chronology of Bishops) 

16th-century Roman Catholic bishops in Mexico
Bishops appointed by Pope Paul III
1557 deaths
Franciscan bishops